Sueb Chundakowsolaya (born 1933) is a Thai boxer. He competed in the men's lightweight event at the 1956 Summer Olympics.

References

1933 births
Living people
Sueb Chundakowsolaya
Sueb Chundakowsolaya
Boxers at the 1956 Summer Olympics
Place of birth missing (living people)
Asian Games medalists in boxing
Boxers at the 1958 Asian Games
Sueb Chundakowsolaya
Medalists at the 1958 Asian Games
Lightweight boxers
Sueb Chundakowsolaya